Arizona v. California is a set of United States Supreme Court cases, all dealing with disputes over water distribution from the Colorado River between the states of Arizona and California. It also covers the amount of water that the State of Nevada receives from the river as well.

When a dispute arises between two states, the case is filed for original jurisdiction with the United States Supreme Court. This is one of the very limited circumstances where the Court has original jurisdiction; that is, as a trial court and no lower may hear the case. In all other cases, the Court acts as the highest level appellate court in the United States.

The cases involved were all named Arizona v. California, and were decided in 1931, 1934, 1936, 1963, 1964, 1966, 1979, 1983, 1984, and 2000.

The original decision, specified the amount of water to which Arizona was entitled under the Colorado River Compact of 1922.

Since then, the case has been relitigated several times because of Arizona's claims of California using more water than it is entitled.

The court determined that the Secretary of the Interior was not bound by Prior-appropriation water rights in allocating water among the states.

 : Arizona argued that the Colorado River Compact was unconstitutional.
 : Arizona requested that the Supreme Court:
specify an amount of Colorado River water for Arizona's use
limit the amount allotted to California
 : The court specified the amount of water to which each state in the Colorado River Compact was entitled.
 : The court adjusted the amounts of water specified in 373 US 546.
 : The court adjusted its previous decree.
 : The court adjusted the specified amounts of water for all parties to the case.
 : The court issued a decree regarding unadjudicated rights of Indian tribes to Colorado River water.
 : The court adjusted its previous decree.
 : The court adjusted the specified amounts of water for several parties to the case.
 : The court approved a consolidated decree.

In summary, as long as at least  of water is available from the Colorado River, California is allocated ; Nevada, ; and Arizona, the remainder. If more water is available, California is entitled to 50% of the water from the Colorado River, Arizona to 46%, and Nevada to 4%. Some of the adjustments involved rights of the U.S. Government with respect to supplying water to Indian tribes pursuant to Executive Orders signed by the President of the United States as far back as 1907.

The 1962 oral arguments set a modern record for the Supreme Court: 16 hours over four days.

See also
 Wyoming v. Colorado (1922)
 Florida v. Georgia (2018)
 List of United States Supreme Court cases: volume 283, volume 292, volume 298, volume 373, volume 376, volume 383, volume 439, volume 460, volume 466, volume 531
 List of United States Supreme Court cases
 Lists of United States Supreme Court cases by volume

References

External links 

 Lawrence Pratt Collection Concerning Arizona v. California and the Colorado River. Yale Collection of Western Americana, Beinecke Rare Book and Manuscript Library.

1931 in United States case law
1934 in United States case law
1936 in United States case law
1963 in United States case law
1964 in United States case law
1968 in United States case law
1979 in United States case law
1983 in United States case law
1984 in United States case law
2000 in United States case law
Colorado River
Environment of Arizona
Environment of California
Flagged U.S. Supreme Court articles
United States Supreme Court cases
United States Supreme Court original jurisdiction cases
United States water case law
United States Supreme Court cases of the Hughes Court
United States Supreme Court cases of the Warren Court
United States Supreme Court cases of the Burger Court
United States Supreme Court cases of the Rehnquist Court